Chaparral is a residential neighbourhood in the southeast quadrant of Calgary, Alberta. It is located at the southern edge of the city, south of the Stoney Trail. To the east it is bordered by the Bow River Valley, to the south by 194 Avenue SE, and to the west by Macleod Trail. It has three sub sections that are not officially recognized, Lake Chaparral, Chaparral Valley, and Chaparral Ridge.

Chaparral was established in 1995, and named for the mediterranean climate biome. The centerpiece of the neighbourhood is a  artificial lake and a  park with two waterfalls. It is represented in the Calgary City Council by the Ward 14 councillor, who is currently Peter Demong.

Demographics
As of the 2019 census, the population had increased to 12,654, (in 4,179 dwellings) an increase of 1,102 people or 9.54%.

Residents in this community had a median household income of $79,761 in 2000, and there were 4.4% low income residents living in the neighbourhood. As of 2000, 14.7% of the residents were immigrants. A proportion of 5.2% of the buildings were condominiums or apartments, and 2.4% of the housing was used for renting.

Education
This neighbourhood has one public elementary school: Chaparral Elementary School. (K-6)
This neighbourhood has one Catholic elementary school: Saint Sebastian Elementary School. (k-6)

Transit
Chaparral is served by Calgary Transit Bus Route 78 (South)

See also
List of neighbourhoods in Calgary

References

External links
Chaparral Community Association

Neighbourhoods in Calgary